Kim Myong-chol (born 11 January 1985) is a North Korean former footballer. He represented North Korea on at least nine occasions between 2003 and 2005, scoring once.

Career statistics

Club

International

International goals
Scores and results list North Korea's goal tally first, score column indicates score after each North Korea goal.

References

1985 births
Living people
North Korean footballers
North Korea international footballers
Association football forwards
China League One players
Yanbian Funde F.C. players
North Korean expatriate footballers
North Korean expatriate sportspeople in China
Expatriate footballers in China